The 2019 Navy Midshipmen football team represented the United States Naval Academy in the 2019 NCAA Division I FBS football season. The Midshipmen were led by 12th-year head coach Ken Niumatalolo and played their home games at Navy–Marine Corps Memorial Stadium. Navy competed as a member of the American Athletic Conference (AAC) in the West Division.

Previous season
The Midshipmen finished the 2018 season 3–10, 2–6 in AAC play to finish in a tie for fifth place in the West Division.

Preseason

Offseason
In December 2018, former defensive coordinator Dale Pehrson retired.  He was replaced by Kennesaw State defensive coordinator Brian Newberry. On January 12, 2019, the Naval Academy athletic department officially announced the hiring of Brian Newberry as the new Defensive Coordinator and Safeties coach, as well as three new assistant coaches in Brian Norwood (Co-Defensive Coordinator/Cornerbacks), Kevin Downing (Defensive Ends/Raiders), and P.J. Volker (Inside Linebackers). Additionally, the remaining defensive assistant coaches from the previous year's staff were shuffled to new positions, with Steve Johns taking over Strikers, Justin Davis taking over Nose Guards/Defensive Tackles, and R.B. Green becoming a general defensive assistant coach.

On February 21 Navy beat writer for the Annapolis Capital Gazette, Bill Wagner, published a story relaying that Fullbacks coach Mike Judge and Nose Guards/Defensive Tackles coach Justin Davis were leaving the USNA football program to pursue other opportunities, with Davis joining the Miami Dolphins as a Defensive Quality Control coach and Davis pursuing a business opportunity. The USNA Athletic Department announced on February 27 the hires of Jerrick Hall from Elon as Nose Guards/Defensive Tackles coach and Jason MacDonald from the United States Naval Academy Preparatory School as Fullbacks coach.

Following the completion of the spring football session, head coach Ken Niumatalolo announced that raider Nizaire Cromartie, linebacker Paul Carothers, center Ford Higgins, and quarterback Malcolm Perry had been selected as team captains for the 2019 season.

Award watch lists

Listed in the order that they were released

AAC media poll
The preseason poll was released at the 2019 AAC Media Day on July 16, 2019. The Midshipmen were predicted to finish in fifth place in the AAC West Division.

American Champion Voting
UCF (12)
Cincinnati (8)
Memphis (6)
Houston (4)

Schedule

Personnel

Coaching staff

Source:

Roster
The Navy football roster at the beginning of 2019 fall camp (as of Aug 6, 2019):

Depth chart
Depth chart published in the 120th Army-Navy Game game notes (as of December 9, 2019).

Depth Chart 2019
True Freshman
Double Position : *

Rankings

Game summaries

Holy Cross

East Carolina

at Memphis

Air Force

at Tulsa

South Florida

Tulane

at UConn

at Notre Dame

SMU

at Houston

vs. Army

Navy Midshipmen quarterback Malcolm Perry made Naval Academy history by setting the single season rushing mark with 1,804 yards, surpassing Napoleon McCallum who held the record since 1983 with 1,587 yards. Perry also became Navy's single season record holder in total offense with 2,831 yards. As well as becoming the career leading rusher in the Army-Navy game and had the most rushing yards in a single game in the series. Perry earned MVP game honors, becoming the 4th quarterback in FBS history to rush for 300 yards. He had 304 yards with 2 touchdowns on his record-breaking day. Navy coach Ken Niumatalolo became the winningest coach in Army-Navy game history with nine wins.

vs. Kansas State (Liberty Bowl)

Navy and Kansas State both accepted initiations to the Liberty Bowl. This was the first meeting between the two teams. Kansas State improved its regular season record from 5-7 in 2018 to 8-4 and the Navy Midshipmen improved from 3-10 in 2018 to 10-2. Navy averaged 363.7 yards rushing per game – 66 more than any other FBS team.

The Navy Midshipmen became the Auto Zone Liberty Bowl Champions. Malcolm Perry was named the Liberty Bowl MVP "Player of the Game". He was 5/7, 57 passing yards and a touchdown, with 213 rushing yards in 28 attempts. Perry also set the FBS single-season rushing record for a quarterback with 1,923 (13 games), becoming the all-time rushing leader. He edged out Northern Illinois' Jordan Lynch who rushed for 1,920 yards in 2013 (14 games). Navy set a new single-season school record with 228 rush yards in the game, (4,586 rush yards in total). Coach Ken Niumatalolo, named AAC coach of the year, completely turned his team around from a dismal 3-10 record in 2018 to an 11-2 record in 2019; just the second time in Naval Academy history with eleven wins in a season.

Source for Match-up Records:

Players drafted into the NFL

References

Navy
Navy Midshipmen football seasons
Liberty Bowl champion seasons
Navy Midshipmen football